The 2018 MAC men's soccer tournament, was the 25th edition of the tournament. It determined the Mid-American Conference's automatic berth into the 2018 NCAA Division I Men's Soccer Championship. The tournament began on November 6 and concluded on November 11.

Akron won the MAC Championship, 3–0 against Western Michigan, making it a rematch of last year's championship. Akron entered the tournament  as the six-time defending champions, and the fourth overall seed. 

The tournament was expanded this year from four teams to six teams.

Seeds

Bracket

Results

First round

Semifinals

Final

Statistics

Top goalscorers 
3 Goals
  Marcel Zajac – Akron
2 Goals
  Carlo Ritaccio – Akron
1 Goal

  David Egbo – Akron
  Morgan Hackworth – Akron
  Ezana Kahsay – Akron
  Jan Maertins – Northern Illinois
  Greg Solawa – SIU Edwardsville
  Andres Muriel Albino – West Virginia
  Tommy Clark – Western Michigan
  Caden Jackman – Western Michigan
  Mike Melaragni – Western Michigan
  Zack Shane – Western Michigan
  Cameron Sipple – Western Michigan

All Tournament Team

References

External links 
 MAC Men's Soccer Championship Central

Mid-American Conference Men's Soccer Tournament